Martin Manley (born March 10, 1997) is a male sprinter from Jamaica, who mainly competed in the 200m and 400m. He attended St Jago High School in Spanish Town, Jamaica.

Manley was a part of the  Relay team that won bronze at the 2017 IAAF World Relays in Nassau, Bahamas.

Personal bests

References

External links
 World Athletics

1997 births
Living people
Jamaican male sprinters
Youth Olympic gold medalists for Jamaica
Youth Olympic gold medalists in athletics (track and field)
Athletes (track and field) at the 2014 Summer Youth Olympics